Yetunde (variant forms: Yewande, Yeside, Yetide, Yejide, Yetunji, Yebode; alternatively spelled Iyabo or Iyabode) is a traditional name of the Yoruba ethnic group for females which factors into Yoruba religious beliefs, meaning "Mother has returned".
 	 
Notable people with the name include:
 Anthonia Yetunde Alabi, Nigerian musician and businesswoman.
 Yetunde Barnabas, Nigerian actress
 Yetunde Onanuga, Nigerian politician
 Yetunde Price, the elder half-sister of tennis players Venus Williams and Serena Williams.
 Yetide Badaki, American actress
 Yejide Kilanko, Nigerian-Canadian writer
 Agnes Yewande Savage, Scottish-Nigerian physician
 Yewande Osho, British comedian and actress.
 Yewande Adekoya, Nigerian actress.
 Yewande Akinola, Nigerian engineer
 Yewande Olubummo, American scientist
 Yewande Komolafe, American chef

Notable people with the alternative name form include:
 Iyabo Obasanjo-Bello, daughter of Nigerian former president.
 Iyabo Anisulowo, Nigerian politician
 Iyabo Ojo, Nigerian actress.
 Olufunke Iyabo Osibodu, Nigerian banker
 Iyabode Ololade Remilekun Wallinkoski, Finnish model.
 Comfort Iyabo Momoh British-Nigerian nurse/midwife.

See also
Babatunde
Tunde

References

Yoruba given names
Nigerian feminine given names
Reincarnation